Parisienne is a 2015 French drama film written and directed by Danielle Arbid. It was screened in the Contemporary World Cinema section of the 2015 Toronto International Film Festival.

Cast
 Manal Issa as Lina
 Vincent Lacoste as Rafaël
 Paul Hamy as Jean-Marc
 Damien Chapelle as Julien
 Clara Ponsot as Antonia
 Bastien Bouillon as Arnaud
 India Hair as Victoire
 Orelsan as Julien's friend

Accolades

References

External links
 
 

2015 films
2015 drama films
2015 multilingual films
2010s Arabic-language films
2010s French films
2010s French-language films
Films about immigration to France
Films directed by Danielle Arbid
Films set in 1993
Films set in Paris
Films shot in Paris
French drama films
French multilingual films